Rosemary Huxtable  is a retired senior Australian public servant. She was the Secretary of the Department of Finance from December 2016 to August 2022. 

From 2010 to 2013, Huxtable was a Deputy Secretary in the Department of Health and Ageing. She moved to the Department of Finance in 2013, also as a Deputy Secretary. In her finance department role, Huxtable played a key role developing several Australian federal budgets.

When former Finance Secretary Jane Halton stood down in 2016, Huxtable was promoted to act as head of the agency, having been recommended to the role by the Prime Minister. She was appointed permanently to the role after it being recommended by the Prime Minister in December 2016. She retired on 8 August 2022.

Awards and honours
Huxtable was awarded a Public Service Medal in 2005.

References

Living people
Year of birth missing (living people)
Place of birth missing (living people)
Recipients of the Public Service Medal (Australia)
Secretaries of the Australian Department of Finance